Tolypelepidida is an extinct order of heterostracan vertebrates.  These armored jawless fish superficially resemble their relatives, the cyathaspids, though, researchers place the tolypelepids as a sister group to the cyathaspids and the pteraspidids (and both groups' daughter taxa).  A recent study by Lundgren and Blom in 2013 implies that the order is paraphyletic, with the type genus, Tolypelepis, being the sister taxon of Cyathaspidiformes.  The typical tolypelepid had a carapace formed from dorsal and ventral plates, and a scaly tail.

References

Heterostraci
Prehistoric jawless fish orders
Devonian jawless fish
Silurian jawless fish
Silurian first appearances
Pridoli taxonomic orders
Early Devonian taxonomic orders
Early Devonian extinctions